The Vancouver Avenue First Baptist Church, located at 3138 North Vancouver Avenue in Portland, Oregon's Eliot neighborhood, was listed on the National Register of Historic Places in 2016.

See also
 National Register of Historic Places listings in North Portland, Oregon

References

External links
 

African-American history in Portland, Oregon
Churches on the National Register of Historic Places in Oregon
Eliot, Portland, Oregon
National Register of Historic Places in Portland, Oregon
North Portland, Oregon